Ronald Harkai (born May 26, 1946 in Cleveland, Ohio, died December 6, 2022 in Grand Rapids, Michigan), often known by the nickname Ronnie, was a musician best known as the drummer on the top-five single “Time Won’t Let Me,” by Cleveland-based rock band The Outsiders.

"Time Won't Let Me" was released early 1966 and peaked at #5 in the US. The Outsiders had three other hit singles in 1966 and released a total of four albums in the mid-1960s.

His musical path began in Cleveland the late 1950s in parochial schools and continued into his performing and touring career with several bands originating in the Cleveland area, most notably The Sensations, The Pilgrims, Tom King and the Starfires and The Outsiders.

Harkai was a recording engineer, producer and consultant.

References

1946 births
Living people
Musicians from Cleveland
20th-century American drummers
American male drummers
20th-century American male musicians